María Dueñas Fernández (born Granada, 4 December 2002) is a Spanish violinist and composer. In 2021 she won the first prize in the Yehudi Menuhin Competition, in the senior category. She is considered the Spanish violinist with the greatest international profile, and one of the most promising musicians of her generation. In 2022 she signed an exclusive contract with Deutsche Grammophon.

Biography
María Dueñas Fernández was born in 2002 in Granada, in a family where there are no professional musicians, but who encouraged her musical training, as she attended concerts from an early age.

Musical education 
She enrolled at the Ángel Barrios Conservatory in her native Granada when she was seven. At the age of 11, she won a scholarship from the Juventudes Musicales de Madrid, allowing her to study at the Carl Maria von Weber College of Music in Dresden.
She then moved to Vienna to study with Boris Kuschnir, and enrolled at the University of Music and Dramatic Art in Vienna and at the University of Graz.

Musical career 
Dueñas has been a soloist with European and American orchestras, such as the San Francisco Symphony, the Luxembourg Philharmonic Orchestra, and the Spanish National Orchestra. In September 2019, Dueñas was designated as the New Artist of the Month by the magazine Musical America, which is the oldest American magazine on classical music. 

She won the 1st prize at the 2021 Getting to Carnegie Hall competition, for which each participant performed the world premiere of one movement of Julian Gargiulo’s new sonata for violin and piano. In 2021, at the age of 18, Dueñas won the 1st prize at the Menuhin Competition, and she won the Audience Prize as well. For the competition, Dueñas played Witold Lutosławski's Subito, Mozart's Violin Concerto No. 4 in D Major, and Lalo's Symphonie Espagnole in D minor. The award includes $20,000 and a 2-year loan of a golden period Stradivarius violin.

Composing career 
Dueñas is also a composer and the founder the Hamamelis Quartett. She composed the piece Farewell when she was 13, which was awarded the Robert Schumann International Piano Competition award in 2016. Her piece was later produced as a music video.

Discography
 So Klingt die Zukunft! Kammermusikfest der Deutschen Stiftung Musikleben 2018. Track 2. Ravel - Tzigane. María Dueñas (violín) & Kiveli Dörken (piano). Deutsche Stiftung Musikleben, 2018
 Gabril Fauré, Après un Rêve, María Dueñas (violin) & Itamar Golan (piano), 2022.

References

Sources

2002 births
21st-century Spanish musicians
21st-century classical violinists
Living people
21st-century women musicians
People from Granada
University of Music and Performing Arts Vienna alumni
University of Graz alumni